Shahroj is a village located in Maunath Bhanjan tehsil of Mau district, Uttar Pradesh. It has total 969 families residing. Shahroj has population of 6,981 as per government records.

Administration
Shahroj village is administrated by Pradhan through village panchayat, who is the elected representative of the village as per the constitution of India and Panchyati Raj Act. This village comes under the Kopaganj development block.
.

References

External links
Villages in Mau Uttar Pradesh

Villages in Mau district